The 2019–20 season was VfL Wolfsburg's 75th season in existence and the club's 23rd consecutive season in the top flight of German football. In addition to the domestic league, VfL Wolfsburg participated in this season's edition of the DFB-Pokal, and also participated in the UEFA Europa League. The season was slated to cover a period from 1 July 2019 to 30 June 2020. It was extended extraordinarily beyond 30 June due to the COVID-19 pandemic in Germany.

Players

Current squad

Players out on loan

Transfers

Transfers in

Loans in

Transfers out

Loans out

Pre-season and friendlies

Competitions

Overview

Bundesliga

League table

Results summary

Results by round

Matches
The Bundesliga schedule was announced on 28 June 2019.

DFB-Pokal

UEFA Europa League

Group stage

Knockout phase

Round of 32

Round of 16

Statistics

Appearances and goals

|-
! colspan=14 style=background:#dcdcdc; text-align:center| Goalkeepers

|-
! colspan=14 style=background:#dcdcdc; text-align:center| Defenders

|-
! colspan=14 style=background:#dcdcdc; text-align:center| Midfielders

|-
! colspan=14 style=background:#dcdcdc; text-align:center| Forwards

|-
! colspan=14 style=background:#dcdcdc; text-align:center| Players transferred out during the season

|-

References

External links

VfL Wolfsburg seasons
VfL Wolfsburg
VfL Wolfsburg